K237 or K-237 may refer to:

K-237 (Kansas highway), a state highway in Kansas
HMCS Halifax (K237), a former Canadian Navy ship